Wil Time Bigtime (formerly known as Willing Willie) is a Philippine noontime variety-game show broadcast by TV5. The show premiered on October 30, 2010, with its main host Willie Revillame. The show commemorated its first anniversary held at the Smart Araneta Coliseum on October 29, 2011.

The show ended its run on January 5, 2013, and a new show, Wowowillie, was launched as its replacement on January 26, 2013.

Hosts

Main host
Willie Revillame (2010–2013)

Co-hosts
Mariel Rodriguez-Padilla (2011–2013)
Camille Villar (2012–2013)
Lovely Abella (2011–2013)
Grace Lee (2012–2013)
Cindy Miranda (2012–2013)

Former co-host
Mo Twister (2010–2011)
Imee Hart (2011)
Beybisaya (2011)
Rufa Mi (2011)
Shalani Soledad-Romulo (2010–2012)
Iwa Moto (2012)
Sugar Mercado (2011–2012)
Rufa Mae Quinto (2012)

Substitute host for Willie Revillame
Rico J. Puno
Arnell Ignacio
 Yul Servo

Featuring
Anna Feliciano
Owen Ercia
Jeff Vasquez
Bigtime Girls
Iona
Wil Time Bigtime Money Girl
Kim Domingo

History

First broadcast under the name Willing Willie, the show was formed as a result of the cancellation of Wowowee and the transfer of Willie Revillame to TV5. Several personalities from Wowowee appearing on Willing Willie include DJ Coki Meneses (disc jockey), Owen Ercia (floor director), Anna Feliciano (choreographer), April "Congratulations" Gustillo, Lovely Abella, and some former ASF dancers who comprise the in-house WW.Girls.

The show premiered on October 23, 2010, with Willie Revillame as host and Mo Twister as co-host. It was earlier reported that Revillame was courting Sandra Seiffert and Venus Raj as co-hosts, but both declined the offer. Valenzuela City councilor Shalani Soledad accepted the job, eventually appearing on the November 8, 2010, episode.

Dancer feuds
Two WW.Girl members, Aprilyn "Congratulations" Gustillo and Monique "Pak" Natada, were suspended for five days from the show in November 2010 because of a fight over lipstick. On January 12, 2011, the WW.Girls group was given a three-day suspension for fighting over each other in Twitter.

Copyright infringement allegations
On November 24, 2010, ABS-CBN Corporation filed a copyright infringement suit against Willie Revillame, Wil Productions, Inc. and TV5 for allegedly copying Wowowee in Willing Willie. However, hearings on the case, which was filed at the Makati Regional Trial Court Branch 66 under presiding judge Joselito C. Villarosa, was suspended after the Court of Appeals of the Philippines granted the request for a temporary restraining order (TRO) by TV5.

TV5 then filed a petition for certiorari, prohibition and writ of preliminary injunction before the Court of Appeals. ABS-CBN responded by filing a motion seeking to dismiss the petition of the former. On March 10, 2011, the Court of Appeals ruled in favor of TV5.

Child abuse controversy
On March 12, 2011, Willing Willie featured a segment in which a 6-year-old boy performed a 'macho dance' to the tune of Dr. Dre's "The Next Episode" as his talent. At first, the incident came and went without much clamor. It wasn't until a clip of the show was posted on YouTube that it began eliciting an online furor.

The episode shows the boy named Jan-Jan is summoned to the center stage along with other contestant. Shortly, Revillame summons the tall man, who stands next to the boy. The tall man never say anything. Revillame then proceeds the boy to greet his family, which the boy said that his dad works as a barber in a parlor shop, and acknowledges his mother's birthday. The boy is accompanied by his aunt to the show. After asking some questions about the boy's talent, Revillame then proceeds the boy to showcase his talent – macho dancing to the tune of Dr. Dre's "The Next Episode". In the process, the boy cries in tears but nonetheless, it makes the audience's laughter and Revillame remarks "Umiiyak pa 'yan" (transl. "He's still crying!"). His aunt, nevertheless, is shown to be supporting the boy.

After returning from the stage, Revillame orders the sound director to play the music again to mimic the movements with the boy, who does so once more. After Revillame ordered to stop the music, he gives the boy P10,000 cash but despite this the boy still in a sad expression. When he asks the boy who taught this talent, at which the boy replies that it was his father and uncle. Revillame even compared the boy's talent to the film Burlesk Queen (1977, starring Vilma Santos). The music resumes several times that causes the boy to do the same for the rest of the show, even at the middle of the question and answer segment. In the end, the host introduces the boy for the one final act, this time, performing atop the platform while being surrounded by women who appear to adore the boy.

On March 25, Benjamin Pimentel of the Inquirer wrote, "We have a big problem if it’s OK for most people to let a big shot TV host treat a child like garbage." This was followed by the Department of Social Welfare and Development releasing a statement three days later asserting that this was a clear case of child abuse. In a press statement, the DSWD condemned 'the emotional abuse and humiliation bestowed on a six-year-old child contestant'. The Commission on Human Rights (CHR) is currently pursuing an investigation of the program for violating Section 10 of Republic Act No. 7610, or the Special Protection of Children Against Abuse, Exploitation, and Discrimination Act.

The Movie and Television Review and Classification Board is also conducting hearings on the issue. On April 8, three members of the MTRCB panel recused from the case. The decision of the MTRCB is due by the end of May.

The issue received condemnation from the Catholic Bishops Conference of the Philippines, showbiz personalities by the likes of Jim Paredes, Bianca Gonzalez, Lea Salonga, Aiza Seguerra, Leah Navarro (of the Black and White Movement), K Brosas, Agot Isidro, Mylene Dizon (of rival program Mara Clara) and Tuesday Vargas, through the social networking site Twitter, columnists of the Philippine Daily Inquirer such as Randy David, Rina Jimenez-David, Michael Tan, and Benjamin Pimentel, as well as militant organizations such as GABRIELA.

Mang Inasal, Procter & Gamble, CDO, Cebuana Lhuiller, Nutri-Asia and Unilever pulled out their advertisements from the show in the first week of April after pressures resulting from this controversy.

As a result, Revillame announced that the show would be on hiatus starting April 11. He warned that charges would also be filed against those who attacked him on Twitter. He questioned why only Willing Willie was singled out, while other shows such as Showtime and Goin' Bulilit were not.

On April 18, 2011, Revillame stated that he would no longer file charges against the celebrities who attacked him on Twitter.

On April 25, 2011, the End Child Prostitution, Child Pornography and Trafficking of Children for Sexual Purposes (ECPAT) filed a child abuse case against Revillame, TV5 and its officials, including chairman Manuel V. Pangilinan. The DSWD filed a similar suit two days later.

The show did not resume on April 25, pending a go-signal from TV5. On April 27, the Philippine Entertainment Portal reported that the show would resume on May 7 with a new format.

On May 3, 2011, MTRCB issued a month-long suspension for the show and placed it under probationary status, meaning that the show needs daily permits from the MTRCB before airing after the suspension is lifted. The days that had passed since the show voluntarily went off the air on April 8 were counted.

Poverty perpetuation
In the process of deliberating the sanctions against Willing Willie, the MTRCB, saying that it was heeding the call for sweeping reforms of the television industry, also brought up the matter of whether the show, and others like it on Philippine television, attracts its audience by offering 'quick fixes' to the audience members' poverty in the form of prize money.

In the decision of the board in which it suspended the Willing Willie show, it stated:

Wil Time Bigtime
On May 9, 2011, Cristy Fermin reported on Juicy! Express that the primetime variety-game show will change to Wil Time Bigtime, on May 14, 2011, occupying the same format and same timeslot.

Games/Segments

Elimination Games

1-2-3 Go
More than 50 individuals from the studio audience has been already selected during the raffle draw and the another 10 studio audiences from his/her group who danced the opening dance number has been selected on-air before playing the game but all of them received a gift pack from the sponsor. They will only choose the numbers 1, 2 or 3 to answer the questions. If the individual contestants selected the correct answer, they will proceed to the next questions but the other individual contestants who chose the 2 wrong answers are automatically eliminated from the game. The remaining individual contestant who chose the correct answer to the final question automatically receives PHP 10,000 cash prize before playing the Shoot Mo Baby! jackpot round. If all contestants chose the 2 wrong answers, there will be another raffle draw for a jackpot round.

Putukan Na!
Four teams consisting of four members each compete to win the top prize in a fun, action-filled balloon-popping game, a popular parlor game. Each team automatically receives P 5,000 then gets to present their cheer to the audience. Each team tries to pop eight balloons in the fastest time, running back and forth, landing on the other member's lap to pop the balloon. The fastest team moves on to the jackpot round but they will receive P 10,000 in cash for a total of P 15,000 cash prize, where they can win the jackpot prize if the team succeeds to pop eight balloons in only 15 seconds.

Willie of Fortune (also known as "Wil Time Bigtime" and "KanTanong")
6 people selected earlier through "themed" auditions compete in pairs in rounds of Willie of Fortune. The in-house keyboardist plays a portion of a song, and the first person to answer the artist/title of the song correctly wins one point. 2 points are required to win the first round to enter the knock out round. In this round, the 3 remaining players go to a knock out question. One song will be played, and whoever can buzz in the correct song title/artist first wins P 10,000 cash and gift pack from sponsor automatically enters the mega jackpot round.

Jackpot Games
Shoot Mo Baby!
Baligtaran
Wall of Fortune
Spin A Wil

Other segments
InstaJam (every Saturdays)

Awards and nominations

Awards
 2011 - PMPC Star Awards for TV - Best Variety Show (as Willing Willie)

Studios
TV5 Studio A, TV5 Broadcasting Center (2010-2013)
Broadway Centrum (during special occasions)

See also
List of programs aired by TV5 (Philippine TV network)

References

Philippine game shows
TV5 (Philippine TV network) original programming
2010 Philippine television series debuts
2013 Philippine television series endings
Willie Revillame
Filipino-language television shows
Obscenity controversies in television
Television controversies in the Philippines